Many countries have adopted a penalty point or demerit point system under which a person’s driving license is cancelled or suspended based on the number of points accumulated by them over a period of time because of the traffic offenses or infringements committed by them in that period. The demerit points schemes of each jurisdiction varies. These demerit  schemes are usually in addition to fines or other penalties which may be imposed for a particular offence or infringement, or after a prescribed number of points have been accumulated.

Under these schemes, a driver licensing authority, police force, or other organization keeps a record of the demerit points accumulated by drivers. When the prescribed point threshold is reached, the person’s licence would usually be automatically cancelled or suspended. Points may either be added or subtracted, depending on the rules of each scheme. A major offence may lead to more than the maximum allowed points being issued. Points are typically applied after a driving offence has been committed, and the licence cancelled a defined time, or after other conditions are met. If the total exceeds the threshold, the offender may be disqualified from driving for a time, or the driving licence may be revoked. After the licence suspension period has expired, the previous demerit points are cancelled.

The primary purpose of such point systems is to identify, deter, and penalize repeat traffic offenders, while streamlining the legal process.

Description 

This article discusses point systems in the abstract and treats points as demerits; in some jurisdictions, points may instead be measures of merit which are subtracted when a traffic offense is committed.

In jurisdictions which use a point system, the police or licensing authorities maintain a record of the demerit points accumulated by each driver. Traffic offenses, such as speeding or disobeying traffic signals, are each assigned a certain number of points, and when a driver is determined to be guilty of a particular offence, the corresponding number of points are added to the driver's total.  When the driver's total exceeds the prescribed threshold, the driver may face additional penalties, be required to attend safety classes or driver training, be subject to re-examination, or lose his/her driving privileges.

The threshold(s) to determine additional penalties may vary based on the driver's experience level, prior driving record, age, educational level attained, and other factors.  In particular, it is common to set a lower threshold for young, inexperienced motorists.

In some jurisdictions, points can also be added if the driver is found to be significantly at fault in a traffic accident.  Points can be removed from a driver's score by the simple passage of time, by a period of time with no violations or accidents, or by the driver's completion of additional drivers' training or traffic safety training.

Major traffic offenses, such as hit and run or drunk driving may or may not be handled within the point system.  Such offenses often carry a mandatory suspension of driving privileges, and may incur penalties such as imprisonment.

Jurisdictions that use a point system

Australia
Traffic laws are the responsibility of the Australian state and territory governments. Demerit points schemes have been adopted by all states and territories, and road authorities share information about interstate offenses.

In all states, drivers holding a full, unrestricted license will be disqualified from driving after accumulating 12 demerit points or more within a three-year period, except in New South Wales, where drivers are allowed 13 points in a three-year period. Those who can prove they are professional drivers are allowed an additional point. The licence suspension period is three months, plus one further month for every extra four points beyond the threshold, with a cap in most states of five months (for 8 points or more over the threshold; e.g. 20 points or more on a full license). As an alternative to accepting immediate suspension, a driver can apply for a "good behavior" period of 12 months. In most states, drivers under a good behavior period who accumulate one or two further points (except in Victoria, which does not allow any further offences) have their licence suspended for double the original period.

Most states also provide for immediate suspension of a licence, instead of or in addition to demerit points, in certain extreme circumstances. These generally include offences for driving under the influence (DUI) of alcohol or other drugs, or for greatly excessive speed.

New South Wales
Provisional licence holders are allowed to incur different numbers of points, depending on their licence class, before their licence is suspended for three months. Holders of a P1 licence, which lasts 12–18 months (which can be renewed), can incur 4 points, and P2 licence holders can incur 7 points in a 24- to 30-month period (which can be renewed). Speeding offences for provisional licence holders incur 4 points, meaning that P1 holders will be suspended after one speeding offence of any speed.

During holiday periods, double demerit points apply for speeding, seatbelt and helmet-related offences. Offences in school zones attract more points than in other areas. Automatic suspensions apply for all drink- and drug-driving offences, as well as speeding by more than 30 km/h.

Victoria
A demerit points scheme was introduced in Victoria in 1970. Learner and probationary drivers who accumulate 5 points or more in a 12-month period may accept a three-month licence suspension or may opt for a 12-month bond. If a driver breaches the bond by incurring 1 point in the 12-month bond period, their licence is suspended for six months. Full licence holders can accumulate 12 points in a 3-year period and are entitled to the same bond option. The list of traffic offences and their respective points is in schedule 3 of the Road Safety (Drivers) Regulations 2009.

In Victoria, drunk-driving offences only result in immediate licence cancellation for unrestricted drivers with a blood alcohol concentration of 0.05 or higher. Readings lower than this have the option of a 10-point penalty being imposed or being taken immediately to court; this option still results in a 4-month suspension for novice drivers. Automatic suspensions apply for higher level charges, and re-licensing may require an order to install an interlocking device onto the vehicle. Automatic suspension periods of at least 3 months also apply for speeding by greater than 25 km/h over the speed limit, or any speed greater than 130 km/h. Penalty points are no longer accrued for excessive speeding offences as of 1 November 2018.

South Australia
In South Australia, if a traffic offence is committed against the Road Traffic Act 1961 or the Australian Road Rules 1999, points may be incurred against a driver’s licence. The number of points incurred depends on the offence and how likely it is to cause a crash. If 12 or more points are accumulated in any 3-year period, a driver will be disqualified from holding or obtaining a driver’s licence or permit. Each 3-year period is calculated based on the dates that offences were committed.

If a driver accumulates:
 12 to 15 points, a driver loses their permission to drive for 3 months.
 16 to 20 points, a driver loses their permission to drive for 4 months.
 20 points or more, a driver loses their permission to drive for 5 months.

Demerit points are incurred whether the offence is committed in South Australia or interstate.

Northern Territory
A demerit points scheme was introduced into the Northern Territory on 1 September 2007. Offences that accrue points include speeding, failing to obey a red traffic light or level crossing signal, failing to wear a seatbelt, drink driving, using a mobile phone, failure to display L or P plates, street racing, burnouts and causing damage.

Learner and provisional drivers are subject to suspension for accumulating 5 points or more over a 12-month period. The 3-year limit of 12 points still applies.

Queensland
In Queensland, provisional or learner drivers may accumulate up to 4 demerit points in a one-year period, and open licence holders 12 demerit points in a three-year period, before receiving a sanction. A driver who exceeds their point threshold may choose between a license suspension for a period of 3 months, or to enter into a 12-month good driving behaviour bond.  If a driver incurs more than one point while subject to a good driving behaviour bond, their license is suspended for a period of 6 months.

Europe

Bulgaria
Bulgaria has implemented a penalty point system with a total of 34 points, introduced in 1999. In 2017, this was increased to 39 points.

Denmark

Denmark has a penalty point system that penalizes drivers with a klip ("cut/stamp") for certain traffic violations. The term klip refers to a klippekort ("punch card ticket"). If a driver with a non-probationary license accumulates three penalty points, then police conditionally suspend the driver's license. To get a new license, suspended drivers must pass both written and practical drivers examinations. Drivers who have been suspended and first-time drivers must avoid collecting two penalty points for a three-year probationary period; if the driver has not accumulated any penalty points, then the driver is allowed an extra penalty point so they can have three maximum. Penalty points are deleted from the police database three years after they were assessed. Police can also unconditionally ban people from driving.

Spain

United Kingdom

England and Wales
In England and Wales, penalty points are given by courts for some of the traffic offences listed in Schedule 2 of the Road Traffic Offenders Act 1988. Where points are given, the minimum is 3 points for some lesser offences and the maximum 11 points for the most serious offences; some incidents can result in points being given for multiple offences or for multiple occurrences of the same offence (typically for having more than one defective tyre); the majority of applicable offences attract 3 or more penalty points. The giving of points is obligatory for most applicable offences, but the number of points, and the giving of points for some of several offences, can be discretionary.

Points remain on the driver's record, and an endorsement is made upon the driver's licence, for four years from conviction (eleven years for drink- and drug-related convictions). 12 points on the licence within 3 years make the driver liable to disqualification; however this is not automatic, but must be decided by a law court.

Since the introduction of the Road Traffic (New Drivers) Act 1995, if a person, in the 2 years after passing their first practical test, accumulates 6 points, their licence is revoked by the DVLA, and the driver has to reapply and pay for the provisional licence, drive as a learner, and pay for and take the theory and practical tests before receiving a full licence again. In the case of egregious offences, the court may order the driver to pass an extended driving test before the licence is returned, even beyond the 2-year probation period.

Since 11 October 2004, there has been mutual recognition of driver disqualification arising from the penalty points given in England and Wales (and/or Scotland) with Northern Ireland; before that date, disqualification in England and Wales would only have extended to Scotland by virtue of the driver registration system covering only Great Britain.

Northern Ireland 
The driver registration system is separate from that of Great Britain with different laws covering penalty points and the offences to which they apply. In other respects, the application of the system is similar to that in England and Wales. Offences to which points apply are indicated in Schedule 1 of the Road Traffic Offenders (Northern Ireland) Order 1996.

Scotland 
Road traffic laws are mostly shared with, or similar to those of, England and Wales, although Scotland is a separate jurisdiction. The driver registration system currently covers all of Great Britain, and the Road Traffic Offenders Act 1988 currently governs the penalty points system in Scotland. The main differences in the penalty points provisions of the 1988 Act are the theft and homicide offences attracting penalty points indicated in Schedule 2 Part II ("Other Offences"), which are not common between Scots Law and English Law.

Germany
The Federal Motor Transport Authority (Kraftfahrt-Bundesamt) located in Flensburg, operates an 8-point system for committed traffic offences. This system was introduced in May 2014, replacing the previous 18-points system that dates back to 1974. Colloquially, these points are usually referred as "Punkte in Flensburg" (Points in Flensburg). They expire after 2.5 to 10 years, depending on the type and severity of each offence. Under certain circumstances, points can be reduced by attending formal training events. Obtaining 8 or more points will result in a revocation of the driving licence; once revoked, the licences will only be reinstated after a Medical-psychological assessment following the ban.

Ireland

In the Republic of Ireland, twelve points accrued results in six months' disqualification. 38 regulatory offences notified by post incur 1-2 point penalties on payment of a fine.  10 more serious offences require a mandatory court appearance and incur 3-5 point penalties. The most serious offences are outside the penalty point system and incur automatic driving bans, and in some cases imprisonment.

Italy 
In Italy, the driver has 20 points by default, and receives a bonus of 2 points for every 2 years of correct behavior, with a maximum of 30 points.

Each traffic violation incurs a specific point penalty (for example, ignoring a traffic light involves a penalty of 6 points).  If the driver loses all points, the driving license is revoked.

In case of the second alcohol abuse in 2 years, the driving license will be revoked.

A suspension is effective from when the driver is personally served with the suspension notice and they must surrender their driving license to the person giving them the notice.

Netherlands
Since March 30, 2002, The Netherlands has a point system for starting drivers (5 years starting from the moment you first passed a driving test, or 7 years if you passed before reaching the age of 18). A driver reaching 2 points in 5 years will lose the driving licence and has to pass a driving test again in order to be regain the licence. On October 1, 2014, this limit was lowered from 3 to 2 points. Drivers can get a point for:
 Dangerous behaviour in traffic,
 Causing an accident resulting in death or injury
 Tailgating
 Exceeding the speedlimit by more than 40 km/h (motorways), or 30 km/h (all other roads)
 Any violation of the law which resulted in injury or damage
Some of these violations could also directly result in loss of the licence. However, when a driver has 2 points, the licence is automatically revoked and a driving test has to be passed again, whereas normally, the violation would only result in the licence being suspended for several months. However, in Dutch media, the effectiveness has been doubted, it was said that points were being given but not always correctly registered.

Norway 
The system is called "prikkbelastning" with prikk(er) meaning point(s). Points are assessed to a driver's license for traffic violations which do not by themselves result in immediate revocation of the license.

After July 1, 2011, the normal penalty for most traffic violations, such as failing to yield or failing to stop at red lights, is three points in addition to the fine. Speeding violations of between 10 and 15 km/h (where the speed limit is 60 km/h or less), or between 15 and 20 km/h (where the speed limit is 70 km/h or more) result in two points, for speeding violations below this no points are assessed. Young drivers between 18 and 20 are penalized with twice the number of points.

A driver reaching 8 points in three years loses his or her driving license for 6 months. Each point is deleted when three years have passed since the violation took place. When the driving privileges are restored after the six-month ban, the points which caused the suspension are deleted.

North America

Canada

Alberta
When a driver accumulates 15 or more points within a two-year period, their licence is automatically suspended for one month.

Ontario
Ontario uses a 15-point system where points are "added" to a driver's record following a conviction, though Ontario's point system is unrelated to safe driving behaviour (a lone driver using a high-occupancy vehicle lane in Ontario will earn three demerit points).

Ontario drivers guilty of driving offences in other Canadian provinces, as well as the States of New York and Michigan, will see demerit points added to their driving record just as if the offence happened in Ontario.

New Brunswick
New Brunswick uses a 10-point system where points are "removed" from a driver's record following a conviction, when a driver reaches 0 points they lose their license. New drivers begin with only 4 points on their license and gain two additional points each year of safe driving to a maximum of 10 points. For example; if you are caught driving while distracted while using a cellphone or GPS in New Brunswick, You will be fined as well as lose 3 points from your license. if you (or any passengers under the age of 16) are caught not wearing a seatbelt in New Brunswick, You will be fined as well as lose 2 points from your license.

United States
The point system is applied in different ways, or not at all, in different states. If a red light running traffic violation is captured by a red light camera, no points are assessed. Aspects of a motorist's driving record (including points) may be reported to insurance companies, who may use them in determining what rate to charge the motorist, and whether to renew or cancel an insurance policy.

Arizona
Arizona uses a point system where your license will be suspended if 8 points are accumulated in one year.  Offenses that lead to this are the following:
 DUI (blood alcohol concentration (BAC) of 0.08% or higher): 8 points
 Extreme DUI: 8 points
 Reckless driving: 8 points
 Aggressive driving: 8 points
 Leaving the scene of an accident: 6 points
 Running a stop sign or traffic signal or failing to yield, accident causing death: 6 points
 Running a stop sign or traffic signal or failing to yield, accident causing serious injury: 4 points
 Speeding: 3 points
 Driving or parking over area where one or more lanes diverge to go in different directions (gore area): 3 points
 All other driving violations: 2 points

There are other offenses that can count toward this (e.g. HOV lane misuse is a 3-point offense)

California
Drivers who accumulate tickets for moving violations may be considered negligent operators and can lose their driving privilege. Major offenses, such as hit and run, reckless driving, and driving under the influence, earn 2 points and remain on record for 13 years.  Less serious offenses earn 1 point which remain for 39 months (3 years, 3 months).

A driver is considered negligent if they accumulate:
 4 points in 12 months, or
 6 points in 24 months, or
 8 points in 36 months

Suspension or Revocation by Department of Motor Vehicles (DMV)

Negligent drivers can be put on probation for one year (including a six-month suspension) or lose their privilege to drive. At the end of the suspension or revocation period, drivers need to re-apply for a license to drive.

The California DMV will revoke a license after conviction for hit-and-run or reckless driving.

Suspension by Judge

A judge may suspend license following conviction for:
 Breaking speed laws or reckless driving.
 Driving under the influence of alcohol or drugs.
 Hit-and-run driving.
 Engaging in lewd conduct and prostitution in a vehicle within 1000 feet (300 m) of a residence.
 Assaulting a driver, passenger, bicyclist, or pedestrian when the offense occurs on a highway (road rage).
 Failure to stop as required at a railway grade crossing.
 Felony or misdemeanor offense of recklessly fleeing a law enforcement officer.

When a driver is cited for a traffic violation, the judge may offer the driver the opportunity to attend a Traffic Violator School, this would include any online traffic school if the court allows. Drivers may participate once in any 18-month period to have a citation dismissed from their driving record this way.  Upon dismissal of the citation, all record of the citation is removed and no points are accumulated.

Regardless of the number of points accumulated, many serious offenses involving a vehicle are punishable by heavy fines or imprisonment.

Colorado
Colorado uses an accumulating point system according to the Colorado Division of Motor Vehicles Point Schedule.  Suspension of driving privileges can result from as few as 6 points in 12 months by a driver under 18 years old.  Points remain on the driver's motor vehicle record for 7 years.  Some motor vehicle offenses carry 12 points per incident, which could result in immediate suspension of the drivers license.  Multiple traffic violation convictions can also result in a suspension of the drivers license if a sufficient number of points are accumulated during a 12- or 24-month period.

Florida
Florida uses a point system similar to that of Colorado. The Florida Department of Highway Safety and Motor Vehicles is the department responsible for the issuance of Driver's Licenses in the state and will also track points issued to drivers who are licensed within the state. The following are point values assigned for the following infractions.

Speeding
 14 mph or less over the speed limit = 3 points
 15 mph or more over the speed limit = 4 points
 Speeding which results in a crash = 6 points (enacted to curtail street drag racing)

Speeding Fines are doubled when the infraction occurs within an active school zone or a construction zone.

Moving Violations
 Moving violation (includes driving during restricted hours and parking on a highway outside the limits of a municipality) = 3 points
 Moving violation resulting in a crash = 4 points
 Failing to stop at a traffic signal = 4 points
 Passing a stopped school bus = 4 points
 Reckless driving = 4 points
 Leaving the scene of a crash resulting in property damage of more than US$50 = 6 points
 Improper lane change = 3 points
 Violation of a traffic control sign/device = 4 points
 Open container as an operator = 3 points
 Child restraint violation = 3 points
 Littering = 3 points
 Violation of curfew = 3 points (a licensed driver who is under the age of 17 may not operate a motor vehicle between 11:00 p.m. and 6:00 a.m., unless accompanied by a driver who is 21 years of age or older and holds a valid driver license, or the operator is driving to or from work. A licensed driver who is 17 years of age may not operate a motor vehicle between 1:00 a.m. and 5:00 a.m., unless accompanied by a driver who is 21 years of age or older and holds a valid driver license, or the operator is driving to and from work.)

Any person who collects a certain number of points within a given time frame will have their license automatically revoked by the state for the length of time listed.
 12 points earned within 12 months results in a 30-day suspension.
 18 points earned within 18 months results in a 3-month suspension.
 24 points earned within 36 months results in a 12-month suspension.

Any driver under the age of 18 who accumulates six or more points within a 12-month period is automatically restricted for one year to driving for business purposes only. If additional points are accumulated the restriction is extended for 90 days for every additional point received.

If a driver license was suspended in the state of Florida for points or as a habitual (but not DUI) traffic offender, or by court order, the holder must complete an advanced driver improvement course before driving privileges are reinstated.

Points issued against a driver's license in Florida remain on the license for at least 10 years.

The state of Florida issues its citizens points against their driver's license for infractions occurring anywhere in the United States.

Massachusetts
In Massachusetts point system is known as Safe Driver Insurance Plan (SDIP). This encourages safe driving with lower premiums for drivers who do not cause accidents or commit traffic violations, and by ensuring that high-risk drivers pay a greater share of insurance costs. The points are accumulated over a six-year period, and reduced for sustained periods of safe driving.

The number of surcharge points assigned to each surchargeable incident is determined by the incident classification defined in the Safe Driver Insurance Plan:

 Minor Traffic Law Violation - 2 points
 Minor At-Fault Accident - 3 points
 Major At-Fault Accident - 4 points
 Major Traffic Law Violation - 5 points

The incident count is the number of surchargeable incidents. However, if more than one surcharge comes from one incident, it only counts as one surchargeable incident.

New Jersey
The Motor Vehicle Commission of New Jersey has a point system. If the motorist receives 6 points or more within a period 3 years or more, they will be forced to pay a surcharge annually for three years, which does include court fees and other penalties. If 12 points or more are accumulated on the motorist's license, then their license will be suspended. Other offenses that lead to automatic suspension of the motorist's license are the following:

 Driving while intoxicated (DWI)
 Operating a vehicle without a license
 Driving a vehicle without insurance
 Failure to pay child support
 Failure to make a court-ordered appearance
 Drug-related charges.
 Drinking alcohol if under the age of 21

The points range from 2 to 8 points, depending on the severity of the offense. Red light camera violations are not worth any points. The motorists can deduct points from their driving records. 3 points may be deducted one year after either the motorist's last moving violation and no violations for at least one year before. The motorist must also complete an approved driver improvement program. 2 points may be deducted if the motorist completes a defensive driving course. However, the motorist may receive point reductions every five years for every course they take.

New York
Under the New York points system, a driving license is suspended after 11 points or 3 speeding tickets are accumulated in 18 months. Points are counted from the date of the incident (usually the date of the ticket) rather than the date of conviction. After a driver accrues 6 or more points in an 18-month period they will be fined a "NY driver responsibility assessment fee" of $100 per year for 3 years, plus an additional $25 per year for each additional point received. This means 1 extra point costs $75 (since the assessment lasts for 3 years).

For out-of-state offenses, New York State Department of Motor Vehicles does not record point violations, with the exception of violations from Quebec and Ontario.

North Carolina
North Carolina operates two parallel point systems: one for DMV license suspension purposes and one for insurance purposes.

The DMV point system assigns 2 to 4 points upon conviction or an admission of guilt for most moving violations; non-moving violations carry no points. A driver's license is suspended for 60 days on the first suspension if twelve points are assessed against the license within a three-year period. Serious offenses, such as DWI and excessive speeding (more than 15 mph over the limit at a travelled speed of greater than 55 mph), result in an immediate suspension on conviction. Points are not assessed for up to two granted Prayers for Judgment Continued (PJC) within a five-year period, though some serious offenses (such as DUI, passing a stopped school bus, and speeding in excess of 25 mph over the posted speed limit) are ineligible for a PJC.

The insurance point system assigns points differently, assigning points to incidences of at-fault accidents and moving violations. Rather than using the points for a license suspension, the points lead to insurance surcharges of approximately 25-35% per point assessed. Notably, points are assessed for insurance purposes even if the license is suspended. Only points within the three years preceding the policy purchase date are considered, and a single PJC per household within the three-year period does not result in points assigned.

Incidents from out-of-state are treated as though they occurred in North Carolina for point assessment purposes.

Pennsylvania
The Pennsylvania Department of Transportation (PennDOT) has a point system that follows:

If the motorist accumulates 6 or more points on their license, they are in danger of losing their license. If the motorist is under 18 years of age and has 6 points or more on their license or receives a ticket for speeding 26 miles (or more) over the posted speed limit, then their license will be suspended. For every one-year period (from the date of the most recent violation) that a motorist has no point related violations, PennDOT will remove a maximum of 3 points from their record.

Violations range from 2 to 5 points (possibly with a mandatory departmental hearing), depending on the severity of the offense. PennDOT has the right to immediately suspend a motorist's license if any one of the following occurs:

 DUI (One-year suspension)
 Speeding 31 miles over the posted speed limit (15-day suspension)
 Accumulating 11 or more points on their license
 Causing the death of another due to the motorist's fault

Point system suspensions are as follows:

 First suspension: 5 days per 1 point
 Second suspension: 10 days per 1 point
 Third suspension: 15 days per 1 point
 All subsequent suspensions: 1 year

South Carolina
In South Carolina, if a motorist has six or more points on his/her driving record, a warning letter will be sent to the motorist's home address. If the motorist accumulates 12 or more points, then the license will be suspended. Motorists may reduce their points by taking a Defensive Driving Course. This course cannot be taken online and it must be taken in the state of South Carolina. In addition, the course must be taken after the motorist has been assessed points on his/her license. However, point reductions may be made within a three-year period. If by any chance the motorist's license is in danger of being suspended, the course must be taken prior to the suspension start time. The points range from 2 to 6 points, depending on the severity of the offense. If a motorist receives a ticket for a DUI, then the license is automatically suspended.

Texas
The Driver Responsibility Program point system in Texas, enacted in 2003, was repealed in 2019.

South America

Brazil
In Brazil, all traffic violations incur a certain number of demerit points, depending on their severity, according to the 1997 Brazilian Traffic Code. If a driver accumulates more than 20 points (5 points for provisional drivers), the driving license is suspended and the driver has to take a traffic education course in order to regain the right (privilege) to drive. However, some infractions incur in immediate license suspension regardless of current point tally, such as drunk driving, engaging in street racing and others. It is also notable that many offenses that only apply to pedestrians also incur in demerit points.

{| class="wikitable"
|Infraction
|Points
|Examples
|-
|Light
|3 points
|Driving while using a mobile phone
|-
|Medium
|4 points
|Parking where is not allowed, Stop on a crosswalk or intersection
|-
|Severe
|5 points
|Not wearing a seatbelt, Failure to signal before turning or changing lanes, Speeding
|-
|Very Severe
|7 points
|Disrespecting traffic lights, Driving a vehicle without the appropriate license, Excessive Speeding
|}

Caribbean

Trinidad and Tobago 
The Motor Vehicle and Road Traffic Bill 2016, which was launched in September 2019, governs the points system, which is referred to as the Demerit Points System.

Drivers holding a permit for over a year may have their driving license suspended if they receive more than 10 points within a three-year period.

- Drivers who receive 10-14 points (over three years) can be disqualified from holding or obtaining a driving permit for a period of six months.

- Drivers who receive 14-20 points (over three years) can be disqualified from holding or obtaining a driving permit for up to one year.

- Drivers who receive over 20 points (over three years) can be disqualified from holding or obtaining a driving permit for up to two years.

Drivers can receive point by the following offenses:

1. Using a wireless communication device to view, send or compose an electronic message while driving or having charge of a vehicle carries a fixed penalty fine of $1,000 and the award of six demerit points.

2. Driving while disqualified from holding or obtaining a driving permit will see the award of 14 demerit points

3. Offences of driving instructor carries a fine of $2000 and nine demerit points

4. Exceeding the specified speed limit by 31 km or more per hour carries a fixed penalty fine of $3000 and six demerit points

5. Motor racing and speed trials between motor vehicles without permission carries a $1000 and six demerit points

6. Driving when under the influence of drug will attract nine demerit points

7. Driving or being in charge of a vehicle while blood alcohol levels exceed prescribed limit – nine demerit points

8. Failure to provide a specimen of breath or blood – 14 demerit points

9. Failure to submit breath analysis or willful alternation of concentration of alcohol in his breath or blood – 14 demerit points

10. Careless driving – six demerit points

11. Failure to produce a vehicle for inspection/Driving a vehicle without a valid inspection sticker and certificate - $1000 fine – six demerit points

12. Use of Priority Bus Route by unauthorised vehicle - $2000, six demerit points

It can take up to two years for points to be expunged from your record, but points expire a year after the date of the violation.

Other jurisdictions
The following jurisdictions also apply point systems:
 People's Republic of China - see also Road Traffic Safety Law of the People's Republic of China
 Republic of China (Taiwan)
 France
 Hong Kong
 Malaysia - see also KEJARA System
 Morocco
 New Zealand
 Philippines
 Serbia
 Singapore
 Slovenia
 Spain
 Poland

See also 
 Driver's license
 Traffic ticket
 Traffic violations reciprocity

References

External links
 Penalty points (endorsements)UK points for various driving offences].
 Understanding demerit points, Ontario, Canada point system.

Traffic law
Scots law
English law
Road safety